Carrosserie Clément-Rothschild produced a series of Clément-Rothschild bodied automobiles in 1902, based on the Panhard-Levassor 7 hp chassis.

History
Carrosserie Clément-Rothschild were based at 33 Quai Michelet, Levallois-Perret, either adjacent to or in Adolphe Clément-Bayard's Levallois-Perret factory.

By 1903 a Clément-Talbot Type CT4K 18hp four cylinder was described as 'Coachwork by J.Rothschild et Fils, Paris'.

See also
 Adolphe Clément-Bayard

Notes

References

External links
 Image of 1903 Clement-Talbot Type CT4K at Bonhams auction. 18HP Four cylinder, 'Roi-D'Italie Tonneau. Coachwork by J.Rothschild et Fils, Paris Registration no. AP 107. Sold for £606,300

Defunct motor vehicle manufacturers of France
Vehicle manufacturing companies established in 1902
Manufacturing companies based in Paris 
Vintage vehicles
Brass Era vehicles